"El Barco" (Spanish for "The Boat") is a song by Colombian singer-songwriter Karol G. It was written by Karol G, Jorge Muñiz and Ovy on the Drums, and produced by Karol G and Ovy on the Drums. The song was released on May 11, 2021 through Universal Music Latino as the sixth single from her third studio album KG0516.

Background 

The song was first released as a promotional single a day before the release of KG0516 on March 24, 2021 without any prior announcement. It was performed live on The Tonight Show Starring Jimmy Fallon that same day. On May 11, 2021, the performance was uploaded on Karol G’s official YouTube channel as the official video and single.

Commercial performance 

"El Barco" debuted and peaked at number 19 on the US Billboard Hot Latin Songs chart dated April 10, 2021. The song received a 5 times Latin platinum certification by the Recording Industry Association of America (RIAA) on November 24, 2021, for sales of 300,000 equivalent-units.

Music video 

The music video for "El Barco" consists of her live performance on The Tonight Show Starring Jimmy Fallon. It was first released on Jimmy Fallon’s official YouTube channel but was later removed and re-uploaded on Karol G’s channel on May 11, 2021. As of January 2023, it has over 360 million views and 1.5 million likes.

Live performances 
Karol G gave the first televised performance on The Tonight Show Starring Jimmy Fallon on March 24, 2021. She sung on top of a boat and on a screen that projected water, landscape with mountains and clouds. The song was performed on March 3, 2022 at the Billboard Women in Music event, where Giraldo was also honored with The Rulebreaker Award.

Charts

Certifications

Release history

References

2021 songs
2021 singles
Karol G songs
Spanish-language songs
Song recordings produced by Ovy on the Drums